The 1911–12 season was Madrid Football Club's 10th season in existence. The club only played friendly matches. The Campeonato Regional de Madrid (Madrid Regional Championship) was not held during the 1911–12 season and this was the first season in which Madrid FC did not play a single competitive match.

Summary
 Santiago Bernabéu made his Madrid FC debut on 3 March 1912 when he was only 16 years old. It was in a friendly against English Sports Club, and it took place at the Pradera del Corregidor, along the Manzanares River in Madrid. The Madridista squad defeated the English side 2–1, and Bernabéu, playing as a left midfielder, scored the winning goal.

Friendlies

References

External links
Realmadrid.com Official Site
1911–12 Squad
1911–12 matches
1911–12 (Campeonato de Madrid)
International Friendlies of Real Madrid CF – Overview

Real Madrid
Real Madrid CF seasons